Jedi are the fictional adherents of the warrior discipline in Star Wars films.

Jedi or JEDI may also refer to:

Arts, entertainment, and media
 Jedi (game engine), a game engine developed primarily by Ray Gresko for LucasArts
 Return of the Jedi (also known as Star Wars: Episode VI – Return of the Jedi), a 1983 Star Wars film
 Star Wars: Jedi Knight, a video game
 A 2008 song by Melpo Mene
 "Chapter 13: The Jedi", 2020 episode of The Mandalorian

Science and technology
 JEDI, an instrument on the Juno spacecraft
 Joint Enterprise Defense Infrastructure, or JEDI, a U.S. Department of Defense cloud computing procurement contract
 Project Jedi (Joint Endeavour of Delphi Innovators), an open source project

Other uses
 Jedi, adherents of Jediism
 Jedi census phenomenon, a movement created in 2001 for people to record their religion as "Jedi" or "Jedi Knight" on the national census
 Joint Energy Development Investments, or JEDI, a joint venture in the Enron Scandal
 Antonee Robinson, nicknamed 'Jedi', an American professional soccer player
 Justice, Equity, Diversity, and Inclusion, particularly within education

See also
 Al Giedi, the double star-system Alpha Capricorni
 Djedi, a fictional ancient Egyptian magician